The Quarterly Journal of Mechanics and Applied Mathematics is a quarterly, peer-reviewed scientific journal covering research on classical mechanics and applied mathematics. The editors-in-chief are P. W. Duck, P. A. Martin and N. V. Movchan. The journal was established in 1948 to meet a need for a separate English journal that publishes articles focusing on classical mechanics only, in particular, including fluid mechanics and solid mechanics, that were usually published in journals like Proceedings of the Royal Society and Philosophical Transactions of the Royal Society.

Abstracting and indexing
The journal is abstracted and indexed in,

References

External links

Oxford University Press academic journals
Mathematics journals
Physics journals
English-language journals
Publications established in 1948
Quarterly journals